Viktor Yakovlevich Klimenko (born 25 February 1949) is a retired Russian gymnast. He competed for the Soviet Union at the 1968 and 1972 Olympics and won a team silver medal on each occasion. Individually he earned a bronze medal in parallel bars in 1968, as well as a gold medal in pommel horse and a silver medal in vault in 1972. At the world championships Klimenko collected four medals in 1970–1974. His wife Larisa Petrik is also a former Olympic gymnast.

References

1949 births
Living people
Russian male artistic gymnasts
Soviet male artistic gymnasts
Olympic gymnasts of the Soviet Union
Gymnasts at the 1968 Summer Olympics
Gymnasts at the 1972 Summer Olympics
Olympic gold medalists for the Soviet Union
Olympic medalists in gymnastics
Medalists at the 1972 Summer Olympics
Medalists at the 1968 Summer Olympics
Medalists at the World Artistic Gymnastics Championships
Olympic silver medalists for the Soviet Union
Olympic bronze medalists for the Soviet Union
Gymnasts from Moscow
European champions in gymnastics